Afonso Mario López was a Cuban fencer. He competed in the team épée competition at the 1924 Summer Olympics.

References

External links
 

Year of birth missing
Year of death missing
Cuban male fencers
Olympic fencers of Cuba
Fencers at the 1924 Summer Olympics